The 2019 Gombe State gubernatorial election occurred in Nigeria on 9 March 2019, the APC nominee Muhammad Inuwa Yahaya won the election, defeating Usman Bayero Nafada of the PDP.

Muhammad Inuwa Yahaya emerged APC gubernatorial candidate after scoring 859 votes and defeating his closest rival, Mohammed Jibrin Barde who received 463 votes. He picked Manasseh Daniel Jatau as his running mate. Usman Bayero Nafada was the PDP candidate with Charles Yau Iliyas as his running mate. 32 candidates contested in the election.

Electoral system
The Governor of Gombe State was elected using the plurality voting system.

Primary election

APC primary
The APC primary election was held on September 28, 2018. Muhammad Inuwa Yahaya won the primary election polling 859 votes against 8 other candidates. His closest rival was Mohammed Jibrin Barde, who came second with 463 votes, while Farouk Bamusa came third with 139 votes.

Candidates
Party nominee: Muhammad Inuwa Yahaya
Running mate: Manasseh Daniel Jatau:
Mohammed Jibrin Barde
Farouk Bamusa
Idris Umar: a former minister of transport
Umar Kwairanga
Abubakar Habu Muazu
Dasuki Jalo Waziri
Ahmed Khamisu Mailantarki
Aliyu Haidar Abubakar

PDP primary
The PDP primary election was held on September 30, 2018. Usman Bayero Nafada won the primary election polling 1,104 votes against 12 other candidates. His closest rival was Jamilu Gwamna, a governorship aspirant on the platform of the Peoples Democratic Party (PDP) who came second with 147 votes.

Candidates
Party nominee: Usman Bayero Nafada, a former Deputy Speaker of the House of Representatives
Running mate: Charles Yau Iliyas
Jamilu Gwamna

Results
A total number of 32 candidates registered with the Independent National Electoral Commission to contest in the election.

The total number of registered voters in the state was 1,394,386, while 627,457 voters were accredited. Total number of votes cast was 623,230, while number of valid votes was 608,846. Rejected votes were 14,384.

By local government area
Here are the results of the election by local government area for the two major parties. The total valid votes of 608,846 represents the 32 political parties that participated in the election. Blue represents LGAs won by Muhammad Inuwa Yahaya. Green represents LGAs won by Usman Bayero Nafada.

References 

Gombe State gubernatorial election
Gombe State gubernatorial election
Gombe State gubernatorial elections
2019 Gombe State elections